The Concord River is a  tributary of the Androscoggin River in western Maine. The Androscoggin flows east and southeast to the Kennebec River near its mouth at the Atlantic Ocean.

The Concord River begins at the outlet of Concord Pond in Woodstock and flows northwest through Milton into the town of Rumford, where it reaches the Androscoggin.

See also
List of rivers of Maine

References

Maine Streamflow Data from the USGS
Maine Watershed Data From Environmental Protection Agency

Tributaries of the Kennebec River
Rivers of Maine
Rivers of Oxford County, Maine